Vitória Futebol Clube may refer to:

Vitória F.C., a Portuguese football club
Vitória Futebol Clube (ES), a Brazilian football club